Cristian Dros (born 15 April 1998) is a Moldovan footballer who plays as a midfielder for Slavia Mozyr.

In his career Dros also played for Zaria Bălți and ASU Politehnica Timișoara.

References

External links 
 
 

Living people
1998 births
Sportspeople from Bălți
Moldovan footballers
Association football midfielders
Moldova youth international footballers
Moldova under-21 international footballers
Moldova international footballers
Moldovan expatriate footballers
Expatriate footballers in Romania
Expatriate footballers in Latvia
Expatriate footballers in Belarus
Moldovan expatriate sportspeople in Romania
Moldovan expatriate sportspeople in Latvia
Moldovan Super Liga players
Liga II players
Latvian Higher League players
CSF Bălți players
SSU Politehnica Timișoara players
FK Spartaks Jūrmala players
FC Slavia Mozyr players